Arvid Östman (31 August 1902 – 2 March 1984) was a Swedish wrestler. He competed in the Greco-Roman bantamweight at the 1924 Summer Olympics.

References

External links
 

1902 births
1984 deaths
Olympic wrestlers of Sweden
Wrestlers at the 1924 Summer Olympics
Swedish male sport wrestlers
People from Västmanland